Marcus Coloma (born October 18, 1978) is an American actor. He has appeared in multiple TV series and the Hilary Duff film Material Girls. From 2019 to 2023, Coloma portrayed Nikolas Cassadine on the American daytime soap opera General Hospital.

Early life
Coloma was born in Middletown, California.

Career
In 2005, Coloma starred in Fox's Point Pleasant as Father Tomas, and played Matt Evans in South Beach in 2006. He has appeared on several television series, including playing Marcus Johnson on The CW drama One Tree Hill in 2006, and portraying Leo Cruz on the ABC Family show, Make It or Break It from 2009 to 2010. Coloma played Father Jonas Alcaraz on Major Crimes in 2017, and portrayed Clark Steedler in False Profits in 2018.
He joined scientology in 2005 according to publications on the Scientology website(13)

Coloma played Hilary Duff's love interest in the 2006 film Material Girls. He starred in the Disney films Beverly Hills Chihuahua 2 (2011) and Beverly Hills Chihuahua 3 (2012) as Sam. In 2019, he joined the cast of General Hospital in the role of Nikolas Cassadine, playing the role through early 2023.

Filmography

References

External links 
 
 Marcus Coloma - TV Guide

Living people
1978 births
American male television actors
American male film actors
Male actors from California
Place of birth missing (living people)